Konkan Railway Corporation Employees Union is a trade union of employees of the Konkan Railway, India. KRCEU is affiliated to the Hind Mazdoor Kisan Panchayat.

In the union elections in 2005, KRCEU got 32% of the votes and lost its hold of the union.

External links
 Article about the 2005 elections

Trade unions in India
Hind Mazdoor Kisan Panchayat-affiliated unions
Trade unions in Indian Railways
Konkan Railway
Railway labor unions
Year of establishment missing